Adelaide is the capital city of South Australia, the state's largest city and the fifth-most populous city in Australia. "Adelaide" may refer to either Greater Adelaide (including the Adelaide Hills) or the Adelaide city centre. The demonym Adelaidean is used to denote the city and the residents of Adelaide. The Traditional Owners of the Adelaide region are the Kaurna people. The area of the city centre and surrounding parklands is called  in the Kaurna language.

Adelaide is situated on the Adelaide Plains north of the Fleurieu Peninsula, between the Gulf St Vincent in the west and the Mount Lofty Ranges in the east. Its metropolitan area extends  from the coast to the foothills of the Mount Lofty Ranges, and stretches  from Gawler in the north to Sellicks Beach in the south.

Named in honour of Queen Adelaide, the city was founded in 1836 as the planned capital for the only freely-settled British province in Australia. Colonel William Light, one of Adelaide's founding fathers, designed the city centre and chose its location close to the River Torrens. Light's design, now listed as national heritage, set out the city centre in a grid layout known as "Light's Vision", interspaced by wide boulevards and large public squares, and entirely surrounded by parklands.

Early colonial Adelaide was shaped by the diversity and wealth of its free settlers, in contrast to the convict history of other Australian cities. Until the post-war era, it was Australia's third most populated city. It has been noted for its leading examples of religious freedom and progressive political reforms, and became known as the "City of Churches" due to its diversity of faiths. Today, Adelaide is known by its many festivals and sporting events, its food and wine, its coastline and hills, and its large defence and manufacturing sectors. Adelaide's quality of life has ranked consistently highly in various measures through the 21st century, at one stage being named Australia's most liveable city.

As South Australia's government and commercial centre, Adelaide is the site of many governmental and financial institutions. Most of these are concentrated in the city centre along the cultural boulevards of North Terrace and King William Street.

History

Before European settlement 

The area around modern-day Adelaide was originally inhabited by the Indigenous Kaurna people, one of many Aboriginal nations in South Australia. The city and parklands area was known as Tarntanya, Tandanya, now the short name of Tandanya National Aboriginal Cultural Institute, Tarndanya, or Tarndanyangga, now the dual name for Victoria Square, in the Kaurna language. The surrounding area was an open grassy plain with patches of trees and shrub which had been managed by hundreds of generations. Kaurna country encompassed the plains which stretched north and south of Tarntanya as well as the wooded foothills of the Mt Lofty Ranges. The River Torrens was known as the Karrawirra Pari (Red Gum forest river). About 300 Kaurna populated the Adelaide area, and were referred to by the settlers as the Cowandilla. 

There were more than 20 local clans across the plain who lived semi-nomadic lives, with extensive mound settlements where huts were built repeatedly over centuries and a complex social structure including a class of sorcerers separated from regular society.

Within a few decades of European settlement of South Australia, Kaurna culture was almost completely destroyed. The last speaker of Kaurna language died in 1929. Extensive documentation by early missionaries and other researchers has enabled a modern revival of both, which has included a commitment by local and state governments to rename or include Kaurna names for many local places.

19th century 

South Australia was officially established as a British Province in England in February 1836. The first governor 
proclaimed the commencement of colonial government in South Australia on 28 December 1836, near The Old Gum Tree in what is now the suburb of Glenelg North. The event is commemorated in South Australia as Proclamation Day. The site of the colony's capital was surveyed and laid out by Colonel William Light, the first Surveyor-General of South Australia, with his own original, unique, topographically sensitive design. The city was named after Queen Adelaide.

Adelaide was established as a planned colony of free immigrants, promising civil liberties and freedom from religious persecution, based upon the ideas of Edward Gibbon Wakefield. Wakefield had read accounts of Australian settlement while in prison in London for attempting to abduct an heiress, and realised that the eastern colonies suffered from a lack of available labour, due to the practice of giving land grants to all arrivals. Wakefield's idea was for the Government to survey and sell the land at a rate that would maintain land values high enough to be unaffordable for labourers and journeymen. Funds raised from the sale of land were to be used to bring out working-class emigrants, who would have to work hard for the monied settlers to ever afford their own land. As a result of this policy, Adelaide does not share the convict settlement history of other Australian cities like Sydney, Brisbane and Hobart.

As it was believed that in a colony of free settlers there would be little crime, no provision was made for a gaol in Colonel Light's 1837 plan. But by mid-1837 the South Australian Register was warning of escaped convicts from New South Wales and tenders for a temporary gaol were sought. Following a burglary, a murder, and two attempted murders in Adelaide during March 1838, Governor Hindmarsh created the South Australian Police Force (now the South Australia Police) in April 1838 under 21-year-old Henry Inman. The first sheriff, Samuel Smart, was wounded during a robbery, and on 2 May 1838 one of the offenders, Michael Magee, became the first person to be hanged in South Australia. William Baker Ashton was appointed governor of the temporary gaol in 1839, and in 1840 George Strickland Kingston was commissioned to design Adelaide's new gaol. Construction of Adelaide Gaol commenced in 1841.

Adelaide's early history was marked by economic uncertainty and questionable leadership. The first governor of South Australia, John Hindmarsh, clashed frequently with others, in particular the Resident Commissioner, James Hurtle Fisher. Adelaide's early economy started to get on its feet in 1838 with the arrival of livestock from Victoria, New South Wales and Tasmania. Wool production provided an early basis for the South Australian economy. By 1860, wheat farms had been established from Encounter Bay in the south to Clare in the north.

George Gawler took over from Hindmarsh in late 1838 and, despite being under orders from the Select Committee on South Australia in Britain not to undertake any public works, promptly oversaw construction of a governor's house, the Adelaide Gaol, police barracks, a hospital, a customs house and a wharf at Port Adelaide. Gawler was recalled and replaced by George Edward Grey in 1841. Grey slashed public expenditure against heavy opposition, although its impact was negligible at this point: silver was discovered in Glen Osmond that year, agriculture was well underway, and other mines sprung up all over the state, aiding Adelaide's commercial development. The city exported meat, wool, wine, fruit and wheat by the time Grey left in 1845, contrasting with a low point in 1842 when one-third of Adelaide houses were abandoned.

Trade links with the rest of the Australian states were established after the Murray River was successfully navigated in 1853 by Francis Cadell, an Adelaide resident. South Australia became a self-governing colony in 1856 with the ratification of a new constitution by the British parliament. Secret ballots were introduced, and a bicameral parliament was elected on 9 March 1857, by which time 109,917 people lived in the province.

In 1860, the Thorndon Park reservoir was opened, providing an alternative water source to the now turbid River Torrens. Gas street lighting was implemented in 1867, the University of Adelaide was founded in 1874, the South Australian Art Gallery opened in 1881 and the Happy Valley Reservoir opened in 1896. In the 1890s Australia was affected by a severe economic depression, ending a hectic era of land booms and tumultuous expansionism. Financial institutions in Melbourne and banks in Sydney closed. The national fertility rate fell and immigration was reduced to a trickle.

The value of South Australia's exports nearly halved. Drought and poor harvests from 1884 compounded the problems, with some families leaving for Western Australia. Adelaide was not as badly hit as the larger gold-rush cities of Sydney and Melbourne, and silver and lead discoveries at Broken Hill provided some relief. Only one year of deficit was recorded, but the price paid was retrenchments and lean public spending. Wine and copper were the only industries not to suffer a downturn.

20th century 

Adelaide was Australia's third largest city for most of the 20th century. Electric street lighting was introduced in 1900 and electric trams were transporting passengers in 1909. 28,000 men were sent to fight in World War I. Historian F. W. Crowley examined the reports of visitors in the early 20th century, noting that "many visitors to Adelaide admired the foresighted planning of its founders", as well as pondering the riches of the young city. 

Adelaide enjoyed a postwar boom, entering a time of relative prosperity. Its population grew, and it became the third most populous metropolitan area in the country, after Sydney and Melbourne. Its prosperity was short-lived, with the return of droughts and the Great Depression of the 1930s. It later returned to fortune under strong government leadership. Secondary industries helped reduce the state's dependence on primary industries. World War II brought industrial stimulus and diversification to Adelaide under the Playford Government, which advocated Adelaide as a safe place for manufacturing due to its less vulnerable location. Shipbuilding was expanded at the nearby port of Whyalla.

The South Australian Government in this period built on former wartime manufacturing industries but neglected cultural facilities which meant South Australia's economy lagged behind. International manufacturers like General Motors Holden and Chrysler made use of these factories around the Adelaide area in suburbs like Elizabeth, completing its transformation from an agricultural service centre to a 20th-century motor city. The Mannum–Adelaide pipeline brought River Murray water to Adelaide in 1955 and an airport opened at West Beach in 1955. Flinders University and the Flinders Medical Centre were established in the 1960s at Bedford Park, south of the city. Today, Flinders Medical Centre is one of the largest teaching hospitals in South Australia. In the post-war years around the early 1960s, Adelaide was surpassed by Brisbane as Australia's third largest city.

The Dunstan Governments of the 1970s saw something of an Adelaide 'cultural revival', establishing a wide array of social reforms. The city became noted for its progressivism as South Australia became the first Australian state or territory to decriminalise homosexuality between consenting adults in 1975. Adelaide became a centre for the arts, building upon the biennial "Adelaide Festival of Arts" that commenced in 1960. The State Bank collapsed in 1991 during an economic recession. The effects lasted until 2004, when Standard & Poor's reinstated South Australia's AAA credit rating. Adelaide's tallest building, completed in 2020, is called the Adelaidean and is located at 11 Frome Street.

21st century 
In the early years of the 21st century, a significant increase in the state government's spending on Adelaide's infrastructure occurred. The Rann government invested A$535 million in a major upgrade of the Adelaide Oval to enable Australian Football League to be played in the city centre and more than A$2 billion to build a new Royal Adelaide Hospital on land adjacent to the Adelaide Railway Station. The Glenelg tramline was extended through the city to Hindmarsh down to East Terrace and the suburban railway line extended south to Seaford.

Following a period of stagnation in the 1990s and 2000s, Adelaide began several major developments and redevelopments. The Adelaide Convention Centre was redeveloped and expanded at a cost of A$350 million beginning in 2012. Three historic buildings were adapted for modern use: the Torrens Building in Victoria Square as the Adelaide campus for Carnegie Mellon University, University College London, and Torrens University; the Stock Exchange building as the Science Exchange of the Royal Institution Australia; and the Glenside Psychiatric Hospital as the Adelaide Studios of the SA Film Corporation. The government invested more than A$2 billion to build a desalination plant, powered by renewable energy, as an 'insurance policy' against droughts affecting Adelaide's water supply. The Adelaide Festival, Fringe, and Womadelaide became annual events.

The COVID-19 Pandemic had an impact the economy and resident life of the city. Comparing to other major cities in Australia, Adelaide is less affected. The city only went to fully lockdown twice since the beginning of the pandemic, once in November 2020 (4 days) and another once in July 2021 (7 days), despite being the nearest city to Melbourne (262 days of lockdown) with 1 million or more population.

Geography 

Adelaide is north of the Fleurieu Peninsula, on the Adelaide Plains between the Gulf St Vincent and the low-lying Mount Lofty Ranges. The city borders the Temperate Grassland of South Australia in the east, an endangered vegetation community.

Much of Adelaide was bushland before British settlement, with some variation – sandhills, swamps and marshlands were prevalent around the coast. The loss of the sandhills to urban development had a particularly destructive effect on the coastline due to erosion. Where practical, the government has implemented programs to rebuild and vegetate sandhills at several of Adelaide's beachside suburbs. Much of the original vegetation has been cleared with what is left to be found in reserves such as the Cleland National Park and Belair National Park. A number of creeks and rivers flow through the Adelaide region. The largest are the Torrens and Onkaparinga catchments. Adelaide relies on its many reservoirs for water supply with the Happy Valley Reservoir supplying around 40% and the much larger Mount Bold Reservoir 10% of Adelaide's domestic requirements respectively.

Geology
Adelaide and its surrounding area is one of the most seismically active regions in Australia. On 1 March 1954 at 3:40 am Adelaide experienced its largest recorded earthquake to date, with the epicentre 12 km from the city centre at Darlington, and a reported magnitude of 5.6. There have been smaller earthquakes in 2010, 2011, 2014, 2017, and 2018.

The uplands of the Adelaide Hills, part of the southern Mount Lofty Ranges to the east of Adelaide, are defined on their western side by a number of arcuate faults (the Para, Eden, Clarendon and Willunga Faults), and consist of rocks such as siltstone, dolomite and quartzite, dating from the Neoproterozoic to the middle Cambrian, laid down in the Adelaide Rift Complex, the oldest part of the Adelaide Superbasin.

Most of the Adelaide metropolitan area lies in the downthrown St Vincent Basin and its embayments, including the Adelaide Plains Sub-basin, and the Golden Grove, Noarlunga and Willunga Embayments. These basins contain deposits of Tertiary marine and non-marine sands and limestones, which form important aquifers. These deposits are overlain by Quaternary alluvial fans and piedmont slope deposits, derived from erosion of the uplands, consisting of sands, clays and gravels, interfingering to the west with transgressive Pleistocene to Holocene marine sands and coastal sediments of the shoreline of Gulf St Vincent.

Urban layout 

Adelaide is a planned city, designed by the first Surveyor-General of South Australia, Colonel William Light. His plan, sometimes referred to as "Light's Vision" (also the name of a statue of him on Montefiore Hill), arranged Adelaide in a grid, with five squares in the Adelaide city centre and a ring of parks, known as the Adelaide Parklands, surrounding it. Light's selection of the location for the city was initially unpopular with the early settlers, as well as South Australia's first governor, John Hindmarsh, due to its distance from the harbour at Port Adelaide, and the lack of fresh water there. 

Light successfully persisted with his choice of location against this initial opposition. Recent evidence suggests that Light worked closely with George Kingston as well as a team of men to set out Adelaide, using various templates for city plans going back to Ancient Greece, including Italian Renaissance designs and the similar layouts of the American cities Philadelphia and Savannah–which, like Adelaide, follow the same layout of a central city square, four complementing city squares surrounding it and a parklands area that surrounds the city centre.

The benefits of Light's design are numerous: Adelaide has had wide multi-lane roads from its beginning, an easily navigable cardinal direction grid layout and an expansive green ring around the city centre. There are two sets of ring roads in Adelaide that have resulted from the original design. The inner ring route (A21) borders the parklands, and the outer route (A3/A13/A16/A17) completely bypasses the inner city via (in clockwise order) Grand Junction Road, Hampstead Road, Ascot Avenue, Portrush Road, Cross Road and South Road.

Suburban expansion has to some extent outgrown Light's original plan. Numerous former outlying villages and "country towns", as well as the satellite city of Elizabeth, have been enveloped by its suburban sprawl. Expanding developments in the Adelaide Hills region led to the construction of the South Eastern Freeway to cope with growth, which has subsequently led to new developments and further improvements to that transport corridor. Similarly, the booming development in Adelaide's South led to the construction of the Southern Expressway.

New roads are not the only transport infrastructure developed to cope with the urban growth. The O-Bahn Busway is an example of a unique solution to Tea Tree Gully's transport woes in the 1980s. The development of the nearby suburb of Golden Grove in the late 1980s is an example of well-thought-out urban planning.

In the 1960s, a Metropolitan Adelaide Transport Study Plan was proposed to cater for the future growth of the city. The plan involved the construction of freeways, expressways and the upgrade of certain aspects of the public transport system. The then premier Steele Hall approved many parts of the plan and the government went as far as purchasing land for the project. The later Labor government elected under Don Dunstan shelved the plan, but allowed the purchased land to remain vacant, should the future need for freeways arise. In 1980, the Liberal party won government and premier David Tonkin committed his government to selling off the land acquired for the MATS plan, ensuring that even when needs changed, the construction of most MATS-proposed freeways would be impractical. Some parts of this land have been used for transport, (e.g. the O-Bahn Busway and Southern Expressway), while most has been progressively subdivided for residential use.

In 2008, the SA Government announced plans for a network of transport-oriented developments across the Adelaide metropolitan area and purchased a 10 hectare industrial site at Bowden for $52.5 million as the first of these developments.

Housing 

Historically, Adelaide's suburban residential areas have been characterised by single-storey detached houses built on  blocks. A relative lack of suitable, locally-available timber for construction purposes led to the early development of a brick-making industry, as well as the use of stone, for houses and other buildings. By 1891, 68% of houses were built of stone, 15% of timber, and 10% of brick, with brick also being widely used in stone houses for quoins, door and window surrounds, and chimneys and fireplaces.

There is a wide variety in the styles of these houses. Until the 1960s, most of the more substantial houses were built of red brick, though many front walls were of ornamental stone. Then cream bricks became fashionable, and in the 1970s, deep red and brown bricks became popular. Until the 1970s, roofs tended to be clad with (painted) corrugated iron or cement or clay tiles, usually red "terracotta". Since then, Colorbond corrugated steel has dominated. Most roofs are pitched. Flat roofs are not common.

Up to the 1970s, most houses were of "double brick" construction on concrete footings, with timber floors laid on joists supported by "dwarf walls". Later houses have mainly been of "brick veneer" construction – structural timber or, more recently, lightweight steel frame on a concrete slab foundation, lined with Gyprock, and with an outer skin of brickwork, to cope with Adelaide's reactive soils, particularly Keswick Clay, black earth and some red-brown earth soils. The use of precast concrete panels for floor and wall construction has also increased. In addition to this, a significant factor in Adelaide's suburban history is the role of the South Australian Housing Trust.

Climate 

Adelaide has a Mediterranean climate (Köppen climate classification: Csa). The city has hot, dry summers and cool winters with moderate rainfall. Most precipitation falls in the winter months, leading to the suggestion that the climate be classified as a "cold monsoon". Rainfall is unreliable, light and infrequent throughout summer, although heavy falls can occur. The winter has fairly reliable rainfall with June being the wettest month of the year, averaging around 80 mm. Frosts are occasional, with the most notable occurrences in 1908 and 1982. Hail is common in winter. 

Adelaide is a windy city with significant wind chill in winter, which makes the temperature seem colder than it actually is. Snowfall in the metropolitan area is extremely rare, although light and sporadic falls in the nearby hills and at Mount Lofty occur during winter. There are usually several days in summer where the temperature reaches  or above; the frequency of these temperatures has been increasing in recent years. Temperature extremes range from -0.4 °C (31.4 °F), 8 June 1982 to 47.7 °C (117.9 °F), 24 January 2019. The city features 90.6 clear days annually.

Liveability 

Adelaide was consistently ranked in the world's 10 most liveable cities through the 2010s by The Economist Intelligence Unit. 
In June 2021, The Economist ranked Adelaide the third most liveable city in the world, behind Auckland and Osaka.

In December 2021, Adelaide was named the world's second National Park City, after the state government had lobbied for this title.

It was ranked the most liveable city in Australia by the Property Council of Australia, based on surveys of residents’ views of their own city, between 2010 and 2013, dropping to second place in 2014.

Governance 

Adelaide, as the capital of South Australia, is the seat of the Government of South Australia. The bicameral Parliament of South Australia consists of the lower house known as the House of Assembly and the upper house known as the Legislative Council. General elections are held every four years, the last being the 2022 South Australian state election. 

As Adelaide is South Australia's capital and most populous city, the State Government co-operates extensively with the City of Adelaide. In 2006, the Ministry for the City of Adelaide was created to facilitate the State Government's collaboration with the Adelaide City Council and the Lord Mayor to improve Adelaide's image. The State Parliament's Capital City Committee is also involved in the governance of the City of Adelaide, being primarily concerned with the planning of Adelaide's urban development and growth.

Reflecting South Australia's status as Australia's most centralised state, Adelaide elects a substantial majority of the South Australian House of Assembly. Of the 47 seats in the chamber, 34 seats (three-quarters of the legislature) are based in Adelaide, and two rural seats include Adelaide suburbs.

Local governments 

	 
The Adelaide metropolitan area is divided between nineteen local government areas. At its centre, the City of Adelaide administers the Adelaide city centre, North Adelaide, and the surrounding Adelaide Parklands. It is the oldest municipal authority in Australia and was established in 1840, when Adelaide and Australia's first mayor, James Hurtle Fisher, was elected. From 1919 onwards, the city has had a Lord Mayor, the current being Lord Mayor The Right Honourable Sandy Verschoor.

Demography 

Adelaide's inhabitants are known as Adelaideans.

Compared with Australia's other state capitals, Adelaide is growing at a rate similar to Sydney, Canberra, and Hobart (see List of cities in Australia by population). In 2020, it had a metropolitan population (including suburbs) of more than 1,376,601, making it Australia's fifth-largest city. Some 77% of the population of South Australia are residents of the Adelaide metropolitan area, making South Australia one of the most centralised states.

Major areas of population growth in recent years have been in outer suburbs such as Mawson Lakes and Golden Grove. Adelaide's inhabitants occupy 366,912 houses, 57,695 semi-detached, row terrace or town houses and 49,413 flats, units or apartments.

About one sixth (17.1%) of the population had university qualifications. The number of Adelaideans with vocational qualifications (such as tradespersons) fell from 62.1% of the labour force in the 1991 census to 52.4% in the 2001 census.

Adelaide is ageing more rapidly than other Australian capital cities. More than a quarter (27.5%) of Adelaide's population is aged 55 years or older, in comparison to the national average of 25.6%. Adelaide has the lowest number of children (under-15-year-olds), who comprised 17.7% of the population, compared to the national average of 19.3%.

Ancestry and immigration 

At the 2021 census, the most commonly nominated ancestries were:  

Overseas-born Adelaideans composed 31.3% of the total population at the 2021 census. The five largest groups of overseas-born were from England (5.7%), India (3.1%), Mainland China (1.8%), Vietnam (1.2%) and Italy (1.1%).

Suburbs including Newton, Payneham and Campbelltown in the east and Torrensville, West Lakes and Fulham to the west, have large Greek and Italian communities. The Italian consulate is located in the western suburb of Hindmarsh. Large Vietnamese populations are settled in the north-western suburbs of Woodville, Kilkenny, Pennington, Mansfield Park and Athol Park and also Parafield Gardens and Pooraka in Adelaide's north. Migrants from India and Sri Lanka have settled into inner suburban areas of Adelaide including the inner northern suburbs of Blair Athol, Kilburn and Enfield and the inner southern suburbs of Plympton, Park Holme and Kurralta Park.

Suburbs such as Para Hills, Salisbury, Ingle Farm and Blair Athol in the north and Findon, West Croydon and Seaton and other Western suburbs have sizeable Afghan communities. Chinese migrants favour settling in the eastern and north eastern suburbs including Kensington Gardens, Greenacres, Modbury and Golden Grove. Mawson Lakes has a large international student population, due to its proximity to the University of South Australia campus.

At the 2021 census, 1.7% of Adelaide's population identified as being Indigenous — Aboriginal Australians and Torres Strait Islanders.

Language 
At the 2016 census, 75.4% of the population spoke English at home. The other languages most commonly spoken at home were Italian (2.1%), Standard Mandarin (2.1%), Greek (1.7%) Vietnamese (1.4%), and Cantonese (0.7%). The Kaurna language, spoken by the area's original inhabitants, had no living speakers in the middle of the 20th century, but since the 1990's there has been a sustained revival effort from academics and Kaurna elders.

Religion 

Adelaide was founded on a vision of religious tolerance that attracted a wide variety of religious practitioners. This led to it being known as The City of Churches. But approximately 28% of the population expressed no religious affiliation in the 2011 Census, compared with the national average of 22.3%, making Adelaide one of Australia's least religious cities. Over half of the population of Adelaide identifies as Christian, with the largest denominations being Catholic (21.3%), Anglican (12.6%), Uniting Church (7.6%) and Eastern Orthodox (3.5%).

The Jewish community of the city dates back to 1840. Eight years later, 58 Jews lived in the city. A synagogue was built in 1871, when 435 Jews lived in the city. Many took part in the city councils, such as Judah Moss Solomon (1852–66) and others after him. Three Jews have been elected to the position of city mayor. In 1968, the Jewish population of Adelaide numbered about 1,200; in 2001, according to the Australian census, 979 persons declared themselves to be Jewish by religion. In 2011, over 1,000 Jews were living in the city, operating an Orthodox and a Reform school, in addition to a virtual Jewish museum.

The "Afghan" community in Australia first became established in the 1860s when camels and their Pathan, Punjabi, Baluchi and Sindhi handlers began to be used to open up settlement in the continent's arid interior. Until eventually superseded by the advent of the railways and motor vehicles, camels played an invaluable economic and social role in transporting heavy loads of goods to and from isolated settlements and mines. This is acknowledged by the name of The Ghan, the passenger train operating between Adelaide, Alice Springs, and Darwin. The Central Adelaide Mosque is regarded as Australia's oldest permanent mosque; an earlier mosque at Marree in northern South Australia, dating from 1861 to 1862 and subsequently abandoned or demolished, has now been rebuilt.

Economy 

South Australia's largest employment sectors are health care and social assistance, surpassing manufacturing in SA as the largest employer since 2006–07. In 2009–10, manufacturing in SA had average annual employment of 83,700 persons compared with 103,300 for health care and social assistance. Health care and social assistance represented nearly 13% of the state average annual employment. The Adelaide Hills wine region is an iconic and viable economic region for both the state and country in terms of wine production and sale. The 2014 vintage is reported as consisting of  red grapes crushed valued at A$8,196,142 and  white grapes crushed valued at $14,777,631.

The retail trade is the second largest employer in SA (2009–10), with 91,900 jobs, and 12 per cent of the state workforce.

Manufacturing, defence technology, high-tech electronic systems and research, commodity export and corresponding service industries all play a role in the SA economy. Almost half of all cars produced in Australia were made in Adelaide at the General Motors Holden plant in Elizabeth. The site ceased operating in November 2017.

The collapse of the State Bank in 1992 resulted in large levels of state public debt (as much as A$4 billion). The collapse meant that successive governments enacted lean budgets, cutting spending, which was a setback to the further economic development of the city and state. The debt has more recently been reduced with the State Government once again receiving a AAA+ Credit Rating.

The global media conglomerate News Corporation was founded in, and until 2004 incorporated in, Adelaide and it is still considered its "spiritual" home by its founder, Rupert Murdoch. Australia's largest oil company, Santos, prominent South Australian brewery, Coopers, and national retailer Harris Scarfe also call Adelaide their home.

In 2018, at which time more than 80 organisations employed 800 people in the space sector in South Australia, Adelaide was chosen for the headquarters of a new Australian Space Agency. The agency opened its in 2020. It is working to triple the size of the Australian space industry and create 20,000 new jobs by 2030.

Defence industry 

Adelaide is home to a large proportion of Australia's defence industries, which contribute over A$1 billion to South Australia's Gross State Product. The principal government military research institution, the Defence Science and Technology Organisation, and other defence technology organisations such as BAE Systems Australia and Lockheed Martin Australia, are north of Salisbury and west of Elizabeth in an area now called "Edinburgh Parks", adjacent to RAAF Base Edinburgh.

Others, such as Saab Systems and Raytheon, are in or near Technology Park. ASC Pty Ltd, is based in the industrial suburb of Osborne and is also a part of Technology Park. South Australia was charged with constructing Australia's s and more recently the A$6 billion contract to construct the Royal Australian Navy's new air-warfare destroyers.

Employment statistics 
, Greater Adelaide had an unemployment rate of 7.4% with a youth unemployment rate of 15%.

The median weekly individual income for people aged 15 years and over was $447 per week in 2006, compared with $466 nationally. The median family income was $1,137 per week, compared with $1,171 nationally. Adelaide's housing and living costs are substantially lower than that of other Australian cities, with housing being notably cheaper. The median Adelaide house price is half that of Sydney and two-thirds that of Melbourne. The three-month trend unemployment rate to March 2007 was 6.2%. The Northern suburbs' unemployment rate is disproportionately higher than the other regions of Adelaide at 8.3%, while the East and South are lower than the Adelaide average at 4.9% and 5.0% respectively.

House prices 
Over the decade March 2001 – March 2010, Metropolitan Adelaide median house prices approximately tripled. (approx. 285% – approx. 11%p.a. compounding)
In the five years March 2007 – March 2012, prices increased by approx. 27% – approx. 5%p.a. compounding. March 2012 – March 2017 saw a further increase of 19% – approx. 3.5%p.a. compounding.

In summary:

Each quarter, The Alternative and Direct Investment Securities Association (ADISA) publishes a list of median house sale prices by suburb and Local Government Area. (Previously, this was done by REISA) Due to the small sizes of many of Adelaide's suburbs, the low volumes of sales in these suburbs, and (over time) the huge variations in the numbers of sales in a suburb in a quarter, statistical analysis of "the most expensive suburb" is unreliable; the suburbs appearing in the "top 10 most expensive suburbs this quarter" list is constantly varying. Quarterly Reports for the last two years can be found on the REISA website.

Education and research 

Education forms an increasingly important part of the city's economy, with the South Australian Government and educational institutions attempting to position Adelaide as "Australia's education hub" and marketing it as a "Learning City." The number of international students studying in Adelaide has increased rapidly in recent years to 30,726 in 2015, of which 1,824 were secondary school students. In addition to the city's existing institutions, foreign institutions have been attracted to set up campuses to increase its attractiveness as an education hub. Adelaide is the birthplace of three Nobel laureates, more than any other Australian city: physicist William Lawrence Bragg and pathologists Howard Florey and Robin Warren, all of whom completed secondary and tertiary education at St Peter's College and the University of Adelaide.

Primary and secondary education 
At the level of primary and secondary education, there are two systems of school education. There is a public system operated by the South Australian Government and a private system of independent and Catholic schools. South Australian schools provide education under the Australian Curriculum for reception to Year 10 students. In Years 10 to 12, students study for the South Australian Certificate of Education (SACE). They have the option of incorporating vocational education and training (VET) courses or a flexible learning option (FLO). South Australia also has 24 schools that use International Baccalaureate programs as an alternative to the Australian Curriculum or SACE. These programs include the IB Primary Years Programme, the IB Middle Years Programme, and the IB Diploma Programme.

For South Australian students who cannot attend a traditional school, including students who live in rural or remote areas, the state government runs the Open Access College (OAC), which provides virtual teaching. The OAC has a campus in Marden which caters to students from reception to Year 12 and adults who haven't been able to complete their SACE. Guardians are also able to apply for their child to be educated from home as long as they provide an education program which meets the same requirements as the Australian Curriculum as well as opportunities for social interaction.

Tertiary education 

There are three public universities local to Adelaide, as well as one private university and three constituent colleges of foreign universities. Flinders University of South Australia, the University of Adelaide, the University of South Australia and Torrens University Australia—part of the Laureate International Universities are based in Adelaide. The University of Adelaide was ranked in the top 150 universities worldwide. Flinders ranked in the top 250 and Uni SA in the top 300. Torrens University Australia is part of an international network of over 70 higher education institutions in more than 30 countries worldwide. The historic Torrens Building in Victoria Square houses Carnegie Mellon University's Heinz College Australia, and University College London's School of Energy and Resources (Australia), and constitute the city's international university precinct.

The University of Adelaide, with 25,000 students, is Australia's third-oldest university and a member of the leading "Group of Eight". It has five campuses throughout the state, including two in the city-centre, and a campus in Singapore. The University of South Australia, with 37,000 students, has two North Terrace campuses, three other campuses in the metropolitan area and campuses in the regional cities of Whyalla and Mount Gambier. The University of Adelaide and the University of South Australia have had multiple proposals to merge into a single university. A proposal in 2018 failed due to uncertainty as to the new name and leadership of the merged university. In 2022, the universities announced a new merger proposal, with the name and leadership issues settled and support from the South Australian government. 

Flinders University, with 25,184 students, is based in the southern suburb of Bedford Park, alongside the Flinders Medical Centre, with additional campuses in neighbouring Tonsley and in Victoria Square in the city centre. 

The Adelaide College of Divinity is at Brooklyn Park.

There are several South Australian TAFE (Technical and Further Education) campuses in the metropolitan area that provide a range of vocational education and training. The Adelaide College of the Arts, as a school of TAFE SA, provides nationally recognised training in visual and performing arts.

Research 
In addition to the universities, Adelaide is home to research institutes, including the Royal Institution of Australia, established in 2009 as a counterpart to the two-hundred-year-old Royal Institution of Great Britain. Many of the organisations involved in research tend to be geographically clustered throughout the Adelaide metropolitan area:
 The east end of North Terrace: SA Pathology; Hanson Institute; National Wine Centre.
 The west end of North Terrace: South Australian Health and Medical Research Institute (SAHMRI), located next to the Royal Adelaide Hospital.
 The Waite Research Precinct: SARDI Head Office and Plant Research Centre; AWRI; ACPFG; CSIRO research laboratories. SARDI also has establishments at Glenside and West Beach.
 Edinburgh, South Australia: DSTO; BAE Systems (Australia); Lockheed Martin Australia Electronic Systems.
 Technology Park (Mawson Lakes): BAE Systems; Optus; Raytheon; Topcon; Lockheed Martin Australia Electronic Systems.
 Research Park at Thebarton: businesses involved in materials engineering, biotechnology, environmental services, information technology, industrial design, laser/optics technology, health products, engineering services, radar systems, telecommunications and petroleum services.
 Science Park (adjacent to Flinders University): Playford Capital.
 The Basil Hetzel Institute for Translational Health Research in Woodville the research arm of the Queen Elizabeth Hospital, Adelaide
 The Joanna Briggs Institute, a global research collaboration for evidence-based healthcare with its headquarters in North Adelaide.

Cultural life 

While established as a British province, and very much English in terms of its culture, Adelaide attracted immigrants from other parts of Europe early on, including German and other European non-conformists escaping religious persecution. The first German Lutherans arrived in 1838, bringing with them the vine cuttings that they used to found the acclaimed wineries of the Barossa Valley.

The Royal Adelaide Show is an annual agricultural show and state fair, established in 1839 and now a huge event held in the Adelaide Showground annually.

Adelaide's arts scene flourished in the 1960s and 1970s with the support of successive premiers from both major political parties. The renowned Adelaide Festival of Arts was established in 1960 under Thomas Playford, which in the same year spawned an unofficial uncurated series of performances and exhibits which grew into the Adelaide Fringe. Construction of the Adelaide Festival Centre began under Steele Hall in 1970 and was completed under the subsequent government of Don Dunstan, who also established the South Australian Film Corporation in 1972 and the State Opera of South Australia in 1976.

Over time, the Adelaide Festival expanded to include Adelaide Writers' Week and WOMADelaide, and other separate festivals were established, such as the Adelaide Cabaret Festival (2002), the Adelaide Festival of Ideas (1999), the Adelaide Film Festival (2013), FEAST (1999, a queer culture), Tasting Australia (1997, a food and wine affair), and Illuminate Adelaide (2021). With the Festival, the Fringe, WOMADelaide, Writers' Week and the Adelaide 500 street motor racing event (along with evening music concerts) all happening in early March, the period became known colloquially as "Mad March".

In 2014, Ghil'ad Zuckermann founded the Adelaide Language Festival.

There are many international cultural fairs, most notably the German Schützenfest and Greek Glendi. Adelaide holds an annual Christmas pageant, the world's largest Christmas parade.

North Terrace institutions 
As the state capital, Adelaide has a great number of cultural institutions, many of them along the boulevard of North Terrace. The Art Gallery of South Australia, with about 35,000 works, holds Australia's second largest state-based collection. Adjacent are the South Australian Museum and State Library of South Australia. The Adelaide Botanic Garden, National Wine Centre and Tandanya National Aboriginal Cultural Institute are nearby in the East End of the city. In the back of the State Library lies the Migration Museum, Australia's oldest museum of its kind.

Further west, the Lion Arts Centre is home to ACE Open, which showcases contemporary art; Dance Hub SA; and other studios and arts industry spaces. The Mercury Cinema and the JamFactory ceramics and design gallery are just around the corner.

Performing arts and music venues 

The Adelaide Festival Centre (which includes the Dunstan Playhouse, Festival Theatre and Space Theatre), on the banks of the Torrens, is the focal point for much of the cultural activity in the city and home to the State Theatre Company of South Australia. Other live music and theatre venues include the Adelaide Entertainment Centre; Adelaide Oval; Memorial Drive Park; Thebarton Theatre; Adelaide Town Hall; Her Majesty's Theatre; Queen's Theatre; Holden Theatres and the Hopgood Theatre.

The Lion Arts Factory, within the Lion Arts Centre, hosts contemporary music in a wide range of genres, as does "The Gov" in Hindmarsh. The city also has numerous smaller theatres, pubs and cabaret bars which host performances.

Live music 

In 2015, it was said that there were now more live music venues per capita in Adelaide than any other capital city in the southern hemisphere, Lonely Planet labelled Adelaide "Australia's live music city", and the city was recognised as a "City of Music" by the UNESCO Creative Cities Network.

In addition to its own WOMAD (WOMADelaide), Adelaide attracts several touring music festivals, including Creamfields, Laneway and Groovin'.

Adelaide has produced musical groups and individuals who have achieved national and international fame. These include the Adelaide Symphony Orchestra, the Adelaide Youth Orchestra, rock bands The Angels, Atlas Genius, Cold Chisel, The Superjesus, Wolf & Cub, roots/blues group The Audreys, internationally acclaimed metal acts I Killed The Prom Queen and Double Dragon, popular Australian hip-hop outfit Hilltop Hoods, pop acts like Sia, Orianthi, Guy Sebastian, and Wes Carr, as well as internationally successful tribute act, The Australian Pink Floyd Show.

Noted rocker Jimmy Barnes (formerly lead vocalist with Cold Chisel) spent most of his youth in the northern suburb of Elizabeth. Paul Kelly grew up in Adelaide and was head prefect at Rostrevor College. The first Australian Idol winner, Guy Sebastian, hails from the north-eastern suburb of Golden Grove.

Television 
Adelaide is served by numerous digital free-to-air television channels:

 ABC
 ABC HD (ABC broadcast in HD)
 ABC TV Plus
 ABC Me
 ABC News
 SBS
 SBS HD (SBS broadcast in HD)
 SBS World Movies HD
 SBS Viceland HD
 SBS Food
 NITV
 SBS WorldWatch
 Seven
 7HD (Seven broadcast in HD)
 7Two
 7mate
 7Bravo
 7flix
 Racing.com
 Nine
 9HD (Nine broadcast in HD)
 9Gem
 9Go!
 9Life
 9Gem HD
 9Rush
 Extra
 10
 10 HD (10 broadcast in HD)
 10 Bold
 10 Peach
 10 Shake
 TVSN
 Gecko TV
 C44 Adelaide (Adelaide's community TV station)

All of the five Australian national television networks broadcast both high-definition digital and standard-definition digital television services in Adelaide. They share three transmission towers on the ridge near the summit of Mount Lofty. There are two other transmission sites at 25 Grenfell Street, Adelaide and Elizabeth Downs. The two government-funded stations are run by the Australian Broadcasting Corporation (ABC South Australia) and the Special Broadcasting Service (SBS). The Seven Network and Network Ten both own their Adelaide stations (SAS-7 and ADS-10 respectively). Adelaide's NWS-9 is part of the Nine Network. Adelaide also has a community television station, Channel 44.

As part of a nationwide phase-out of analogue television in Australia, Adelaide's analogue television service was shut down on 2 April 2013.

The Foxtel pay TV service is also available via cable or satellite to the entire metropolitan area.

All the major broadcasting networks also operate online on-demand television services, alongside internet-only services such as Stan, Fetch TV, Netflix, YouTube, Disney+, and Kayo Sports.

Radio 

There are 20 radio stations that serve the metropolitan area, as well as four stations that serve only parts of the metropolitan area; six commercial stations, six community stations, six national stations and two narrowcast stations.

DAB+ digital radio has been broadcasting in metropolitan Adelaide since 20 May 2009, and currently offers a choice of 41 stations all operated by the existing licensed radio broadcasters, which includes high-quality simulcast of all AM and FM stations.

Sport 

The main sports played professionally in Adelaide are Australian Rules football, association football (soccer), cricket, netball, and basketball. Adelaide is the home of two Australian Football League teams: the Adelaide Football Club and Port Adelaide Football Club, and one A-League soccer team, Adelaide United. A local Australian rules football league, the SANFL, is made up of 10 teams from around Adelaide. The SANFL has been in operation since 1877 when it began as the South Australian Football Association (SAFL) before changing its name to the SANFL in 1927. The SANFL is the oldest surviving football league of any code played in Australia.

Adelaide has developed a strong culture of attracting crowds to major sporting events. Until the completion of the 2012–14 renovation and upgrade of the Adelaide Oval, most large sporting events took place at either Football Park (the then home base of the Adelaide Crows, and the then Port Adelaide home game venue), or the historic Adelaide Oval, home of the South Australia Redbacks and the Adelaide Strikers cricket teams. Since completion of the upgrade, home games for Adelaide Crows and Port Adelaide now take place at Adelaide Oval.

Since 1884, Adelaide Oval has also hosted an international cricket test every summer, along with a number of One Day International cricket matches. Memorial Drive Park, adjacent to the Adelaide Oval, used to host Davis Cup and other major tennis events, including the Australian Open and the Adelaide International. Adelaide's professional association football team, Adelaide United, play in the A-League. Founded in 2003, their home ground is Hindmarsh Stadium, which has a capacity of 17,000 and is one of the few purpose-built soccer stadia in Australia. Prior to United's foundation, Adelaide City and West Adelaide represented the city in the National Soccer League. The two sides, which contest the Adelaide derby against one another, now play in the National Premier Leagues South Australia.

For two years, 1997 and 1998, Adelaide was represented in Australia's top level rugby league, after the New South Wales Rugby League had played a single game per season at the Adelaide Oval for five years starting in 1991. The Adelaide Rams were formed and played in the breakaway Super League (SL) competition in 1997 before moving to the new National Rugby League in 1998. Initially playing at the Adelaide Oval, the club moved to the more suitable Hindmarsh Stadium late in the 1998 season. As part of a peace deal with the Australian Rugby League to end the Super League war, the club's owners News Limited (who were also owners of the SL) suddenly closed the club only weeks before the start of the 1999 season.

Adelaide has two professional basketball teams, the men's team being the Adelaide 36ers which plays in the National Basketball League (NBL) and the women's team, the Adelaide Lightning which plays in the Women's National Basketball League (WNBL). Both teams play their home games at the Titanium Security Arena. Adelaide has a professional netball team, the Adelaide Thunderbirds, which plays in the national netball competition, the Suncorp Super Netball championship, with home games played at Priceline Stadium. The Thunderbirds occasionally play games or finals at the Titanium Security Arena, while international netball matches are usually played at the 10,500 seat Adelaide Entertainment Centre. The Titanium Security Arena has a capacity of 8,000 and is the largest purpose-built basketball stadium in Australia.

Since 1999 Adelaide and its surrounding areas have hosted the Tour Down Under bicycle race, organised and directed by Adelaide-based Michael Turtur. Turtur won an Olympic gold medal for Australia in the 4000 m team pursuit at the 1984 Los Angeles Olympics. The Tour Down Under is the largest cycling event outside Europe and was the first event outside Europe to be granted UCI ProTour status. 

Adelaide maintains a franchise in the Australian Baseball League, the Adelaide Giants. They have been playing since 2009, and their home stadium (until 2016) was Norwood Oval. From 2016 the team moved to the Diamond Sports Stadium located near the Adelaide International Airport due to renovations at Norwood.

Adelaide also has an ice hockey team, Adelaide Adrenaline in the Australian Ice Hockey League (AIHL). It was national champions in 2009 and plays its games at the IceArenA.

The Australian Grand Prix for World Championship Formula One racing was hosted by Adelaide from 1985 to 1995 on the Adelaide Street Circuit which was laid out in the city's East End as well as the eastern parklands including the Victoria Park Racecourse. The Grand Prix became a source of pride, and losing the event to Melbourne in a surprise announcement in mid-1993 left a void that has since been filled with the highly successful Clipsal 500 for V8 Supercar racing, held on a modified version of the same street circuit. The Classic Adelaide, a rally of classic sporting vehicles, is also held in the city and its surrounds.

Adelaide formerly had three horse racing venues. Victoria Park, Cheltenham Park Racecourse, both of which have now closed, and Morphettville Racecourse that remains the home of the South Australian Jockey Club. It also has Globe Derby Park for Harness racing that opened in 1969, and by 1973 had become Adelaide's premier harness racing venue taking over from the Wayville Showgrounds, as well as Greyhound Park for greyhound racing that opened in 1972.

The World Solar Challenge race attracts teams from around the world, most of which are fielded by universities or corporations, although some are fielded by high schools. The race has a 20-years' history spanning nine races, with the inaugural event taking place in 1987. Adelaide hosted the 2012 World Bowls Championships at Lockleys Bowling Club, becoming the third city in the world to have held the championships twice, having previously hosted the event in 1996.

Dirt track speedway is also popular in Adelaide with three operating speedways. Adelaide Motorsport Park, located adjacent to the Adelaide International Raceway road racing circuit at Virginia ( north of the city centre) has been in continuous operation since 1979 after the closure of the popular Rowley Park Speedway. Gillman Speedway located in the semi-industrial suburb of Gillman, has been in operation since 1998 and caters to Motorcycle speedway and Sidecars, while the Sidewinders Speedway located in Wingfield is also a motorcycle speedway dedicated to Under-16 riders and has been in operation since 1978. 

In 2016, backed by South Australia's Peregrine Group owners of OTR (On the run service stations and 24/7-hour convenient stores) opened up a multi-purpose facility; a state-of-the-art motorsporting park and a hotel alongside its newer OTR service station outside a small township of Tailem Bend currently named The Bend Motorsport Park. Design for thrill seekers and rev-heads the facility currently host South Australia's second V8 Supercars motoring event during a round in August and hopes to bring in other major international motoring events such as SBK Superbikes and other well established FIA motoring events.

Adelaide is home to the Great Southern Slam, the world's largest roller derby tournament. The tournament has been held biennially over Australia's Queen's Birthday holiday weekend since 2010. In 2014, and 2016 the tournament featured 45 teams playing in two divisions. In 2018, the tournament has expanded to 48 teams competing in three divisions.

Infrastructure

Transport 

Being centrally located on the Australian mainland, Adelaide forms a strategic transport hub for east–west and north–south routes. The city itself has a metropolitan public transport system managed by and known as the Adelaide Metro. The Adelaide Metro consists of a contracted bus system including the O-Bahn Busway, 6 commuter rail lines (diesel and electric), and a small tram network operating between inner suburb Hindmarsh, the city centre, and seaside Glenelg. Tramways were largely dismantled in the 1950s, but saw a revival in the 2010s with upgrades and extensions.

Road transport in Adelaide has historically been easier than many of the other Australian cities, with a well-defined city layout and wide multiple-lane roads from the beginning of its development. Adelaide was known as a "twenty-minute city", with commuters having been able to travel from metropolitan outskirts to the city proper in roughly twenty minutes. However, such arterial roads often experience traffic congestion as the city grows.

The Adelaide metropolitan area has one freeway and four expressways. In order of construction, they are:
 The South Eastern Freeway (M1), connects the south-east corner of the Adelaide Plain to the Adelaide Hills and beyond to Murray Bridge and Tailem Bend, where it then continues as National Highway 1 south-east to Melbourne.
 The Southern Expressway (M2), connecting the outer southern suburbs with the inner southern suburbs and the city centre. It duplicates the route of South Road.
 The North-South Motorway (M2), is an ongoing major project that will become the major north–south corridor, replacing most of what is now South Road, connecting the Southern Expressway and the Northern Expressway via a motorway with no traffic lights. As of 2020 the motorway's northern half is complete (save for a small link under construction at Croydon Park), connecting the Northern Expressway to Adelaide's inner north-west; the section running through Adelaide's inner west and inner south-west is awaiting funding.
 The Port River Expressway (A9), connects Port Adelaide and Outer Harbor to Port Wakefield Road at the northern "entrance" to the metropolitan area.
 The Northern Expressway (Max Fatchen Expressway) (M2), is the northern suburbs bypass route connecting the Sturt Highway (National Highway 20) via the Gawler Bypass to Port Wakefield Road at a point a few kilometres north of the Port River Expressway connection.
 The Northern Connector, completed in 2020, links the North South Motorway to the Northern Expressway.

Airports 

The Adelaide metropolitan area has two commercial airports, Adelaide Airport and Parafield Airport. Adelaide Airport, in Adelaide's south-western suburbs, serves in excess of 8 million passengers annually. Parafield Airport served as Adelaide's main aerodrome until the opening of the Adelaide Airport in February 1955. Adelaide Airport serves many international and domestic destinations including all Australian state capitals.

Adelaide is also home to a military airport, known as Edinburgh Airport, located in the northern suburbs. It was built in 1955 in a joint initiative with the United Kingdom for weapon development.

Health 

Adelaide's two largest hospitals are the Royal Adelaide Hospital (RAH) in Adelaide Parklands, a teaching hospital affiliated with the University of Adelaide (800 beds), and the Flinders Medical Centre (580 beds) at Bedford Park, affiliated with Flinders University. The RAH also operates additional campuses for specialist care throughout the suburbs including the Hampstead Rehabilitation Centre (150 beds) at Northfield and the Glenside Campus (129 beds) for acute mental health services. 

Other major public hospitals are the Women's and Children's Hospital (305 beds), at North Adelaide; the Queen Elizabeth Hospital (340 beds) at Woodville; Modbury Hospital (178 beds) at Modbury; and the Lyell McEwin Hospital (198 beds) at Elizabeth Vale. Numerous private hospitals are also located throughout the city, with the largest operators being not-for-profits Adelaide Community Healthcare Alliance (3 hospitals) and Calvary Care (4 hospitals).

In 2017, the RAH was relocated from the city's East End to a new AU$2.3 billion facility built over former railyards in the West End. The state-of-the-art hospital forms part of a new biomedical precinct called BioMed City that collocates the South Australian Health and Medical Research Institute (SAHMRI), the University of Adelaide Health and Medical Sciences building, the University of South Australia's Health Innovation Building, and the state's Dental Hospital. SAHMRI is building a $300 million second facility due to be completed by 2022 to house the Australian Bragg Centre with Australia's first proton therapy unit. There are also plans for the Women's and Children's Hospital to be relocated to the precinct adjacent the RAH by 2024.

The largest provider of community health care within Adelaide is the not-for-profit Royal District Nursing Service (RDNS), which provides out of hospital care and hospital avoidance care.

Energy 
Adelaide's energy requirements were originally met by the Adelaide Electric Supply Company, which was nationalised by the Playford government in 1946, becoming the Electricity Trust of South Australia (ETSA). Despite significant public opposition and the Labor party's anti-privatisation stance which left the Liberal party one vote short of the numbers needed to pass the legislation, ETSA was privatised by the Olsen Government in 1999 by way of a 200-year lease for the distribution network (ETSA Utilities, later renamed SA Power Networks) and the outright purchase of ETSA Power by the Cheung Kong Holdings for $3.5 billion (11 times ETSA's annual earnings) after Labor MP Trevor Crothers resigned from the party and voted with the government.

The electricity retail market was opened to competition in 2003 and although competition was expected to result in lower retail costs, prices increased by 23.7% in the market's first year. In 2004, the privatisation was deemed to be a failure with consumers paying 60% more for their power and with the state government estimated to lose $3 billion in power generation net income in the first ten years of privatisation. In 2012, the industry came under scrutiny for allegedly reducing supply by shutting down generators during periods of peak demand to force prices up. Increased media attention also revealed that in 2009 the state government had approved a 46% increase in retail prices to cover expected increases in the costs of generation while generation costs had in fact fallen 35% by 2012. South Australia has the highest retail price for electricity in the country.

Privatisation led to competition from a variety of companies who now separately provide for the generation, transmission, distribution and retail sales of gas and electricity. Electricity generation comes from a range of technologies and operators. ElectraNet operates the high-voltage electricity transmission network. SA Power Networks distributes electricity to end users. The largest electricity and gas retailing companies are also the largest generating companies.

The largest fossil fuel power stations are the Torrens Island Power Station gas-fired plant operated by AGL Energy and the Pelican Point Power Station operated by Engie. South Australia also has wind and solar power and connections to the national grid. Gas is supplied from the Moomba Gas Processing Plant in the Cooper Basin via the Moomba Adelaide Pipeline System and the SEAGas pipeline from Victoria.

In 2011, South Australia generated 18% of its electricity from wind power, and had 51% of the installed capacity of wind generators in Australia.

Due to almost universal blackouts within the city during September 2016, the state worked with Tesla to produce the world's largest electricity battery at Hornsdale Power Reserve which has increased that state's electrical security to the extent in which large blackouts are no longer an event.

Water 

The provision of water services is by the government-owned SA Water. Adelaide's water is supplied from its seven reservoirs: Mount Bold, Happy Valley, Myponga, Millbrook, Hope Valley, Little Para and South Para. The yield from these reservoir catchments can be as little as 10% of the city's requirements (90GL per annum) in drought years and about 60% in average years. The remaining demand is met by the pumping of water from the River Murray.

A sea-water desalination plant capable of supplying 100GL per annum was built during the 2001–2009 drought; however, it operated at about 8% of its capacity until 2019. In December 2018, the State and Federal Governments agreed to fund a $2m study to determine how the plant could be used to reduce reliance on river water, in an effort to help save the Murray River basin and mouth (including the Coorong) from further ecological damage.

Communications
AdelaideFree WiFi is a citywide free Wi-Fi network covering most of the inner city areas of Adelaide, primarily the Adelaide CBD and Northern Adelaide precincts. It was officially launched at the Adelaide Central Markets on Tuesday 25 June 2014. It is provided by Internode, with infrastructure provided by outdoor Cisco WiFi N access points attached to the top of lighting poles, as well as inside cafes and businesses across the city.

See also 

 Adelaide Hills
 City of Adelaide
 Music of Adelaide
 Port Adelaide

 Lists
 Images of Adelaide
 List of Adelaide obsolete suburb names
 List of Adelaide parks and gardens
 List of Adelaide railway stations
 List of Adelaide suburbs
 List of films shot in Adelaide
 List of people from Adelaide
 List of protected areas in Adelaide
 List of public art in South Australia
 List of public transport routes in Adelaide
 List of South Australian commercial icons
 List of sporting clubs in Adelaide
 List of tallest buildings in Adelaide
 Sister cities of the City of Adelaide (the Local government area that governs the city centre)
 Tourist attractions in South Australia

Notes

References

Further reading 

 
 (full text)

External links 

 Adelaide City Council > Official City Guide
 Adelaide City Council
 Kids in Adelaide Retrieved 12 May 2020.

 
1836 establishments in Australia
Australian capital cities
Cities in South Australia
Coastal cities in Australia
Planned capitals
Populated places established in 1836
Metropolitan areas of Australia